Šopron may refer to:

 Sopron, a city in Hungary
 Šopron, Croatia, a village near Kalnik, Koprivnica-Križevci County, Croatia